Aruna is the charioteer of Surya (Sun god) in Hinduism. He is the elder brother of Garuda. Aruna and Garuda are the sons of Vedic sage Kashyapa and his wife Vinata, daughter of Prajapati Daksha. His children were Sampati and Jatayu. He is also found in Buddhism and Jainism literature and arts.

Mythology

Birth 
Aruna is found in different, inconsistent Indian legends. In the epic Mahabharata, he was born prematurely and partially developed from an egg. According to this version, Kashyapa Prajapati's two wives Vinata and Kadru wanted to have children. Kashyapa granted them a boon. Kadru asked for one thousand 'Dirghadeha' (meaning long bodied) Nāga (serpent) sons, while Vinata wanted only two yet extremely strong 'Divyadeha' (meaning emitting golden aura from body). Kashyapa blessed them, and then went away to a forest. Later, Kadru gave birth to one thousand eggs, while Vinata gave birth to two eggs. These incubated for five hundred years, upon which Kadru broke the eggs open and out came her 1,000 sons. Vinata eager for her sons, broke one of the eggs from which emerged the partially formed Aruna. Since Aruna was born prematurely, his body was partially developed. Enraged by the haste of his mother, he cursed her that she will become the slave of Kadru for 500 years, when the second egg will break and his son will redeem her. Having cursed his mother, Aruna disappeared. He was bestowed to be the charioteer to Surya by his father, Prajapati Kasyapa. Accordingly, Vinata waited, and later the fully developed mighty eagle, her second born named Garuda (vehicle of Vishnu) was born.

The epic narrates that in another tale that Surya began burning intensely angered by the attacks of Rahu (Rahu swallowing Surya is described to cause solar eclipses in Hindu mythology). The heat was so intense that it started destroying all living beings. The god Brahma asked Aruna to become the charioteer of Surya, to shelter beings from Surya's burning heat.

In the epics 
According to the Ramayana, Aruna was married to Shyeni with whom he had two sons – Jatayu and Sampati. Both of his sons played important role in the epic.

There is a legend about Mahabharata that Surya offered Aruna and his divine chariot to his son Karna which he denied as he didn't want to rely on others to win the war, especially against Arjuna, who he acknowledged as a capable rival .

Another legend, generally told in Indian folk tales linked to the Ramayana, states that Aruna, once became a woman named Aruni and entered an assembly of celestial nymphs, where no man except the king of Heaven - Indra was allowed. Indra fell in love with Aruni and fathered a son named Vali from her. The next day, at Surya's request, Aruna again assumed female form, and Surya fathered a son, Sugriva. Both children were given to Ahalya for rearing, but her husband sage Gautama cursed them, causing them to turn into monkeys, as he did not like them.

Citations

General references 
Dictionary of Hindu Lore and Legend by Anna Dallapiccola
 Monier Monier-Williams: A Sanskrit-English Dictionary. Oxford U Pr, 1899.
 Robert Graves: The Greek Myths. 1955.
Devī-Bhāgavata Purāṇa 10:13
 
 

 

Characters in the Ramayana
Hindu gods
Solar gods